Ruins is an Australian black metal band, based in Hobart, Tasmania. The band was formed somewhere between 2000 and 2002 by Alex Pope (formerly of Sea Scouts) and Dave Haley (The Amenta, Blood Duster and Psycroptic).

Recording
Ruins began as a recording project, featuring Pope supplying vocals, guitar and bass, with Haley on drums. It has been incorrectly reported that Haley is merely a session player in the band, and he has publicly dismissed such views as nonsense. The band consists of two core-members used on recordings, with extra live members added for shows, similar to Norwegian black metal band, Satyricon. Initial recordings were intended for demo purposes only, but were decided later to be of sufficient quality for public use.  Their first recording, Atom and Time, was released in 2004 by Blacktalon Media.

Their debut full length album Spun Forth as Dark Nets was engineered by Joe Haley, Dave's brother and member of the live Ruins line-up.  From the response to their recordings, Ruins decided to recruit session musicians to play live.

Live
Joe Haley and Kai Summers joined Ruins as live session members on guitar and bass respectively.  When Summers has been unavailable for shows, Tom Void has filled in.  However, Summers remains the full-time live member.  Ruins have toured extensively across Australia and New Zealand, supporting many well-known overseas bands including Satyricon, Celtic Frost, Immortal, Pig Destroyer, and Wolves in the Throne Room.

Current
Their third release, Cauldron (2008), was repressed on limited edition vinyl by Debemur Morti Productions. Front the Final Foes, which was released in late 2009, showcased a heavier production style, and less introspective songwriting.

Pope contributed vocals to fellow Tasmanian Moribund Records label mates, Thrall's album, Away from the Haunts of Men.

Releases
 Atom and Time EP (2004)
 Spun Forth as Dark Nets (2005)
 Cauldron (2008)
 Front the Final Foes (2009)
 Place of No Pity (2012)

Compilations
 Blacktalon Media –  Legions – Opening of the Southern Gate double compilation, 2004 – featuring the Ruins track "Desolation".
 Prime Cuts – A Blaze in the Southern Skies compilation, 2007 – featuring the Ruins track "Suicidal Pulse".

References

External links

 Interview with Dave Haley from Metal Underground.com
 Neurotic Records Artist Biography
 Psycroptic Member Listing - CV - J. and D. Haley.
 Stomp Product Description - Ruins Cauldron

Australian black metal musical groups